Jean Nicolas Vallot (22 February 1771 in Dijon – 22 January 1860, idem) was a French entomologist. He wrote Détermination précise des insectes nuisibles, mentionnés dans les différents traités relatifs à la culture des arbres fruitiers, et indications des moyens à employer pour s'opposer à leurs ravages (1827)

He described the predatory gall midge Feltiella acarisuga.

References
 Gaedike, R.; Groll, E. K. & Taeger, A. 2012: Bibliography of the entomological literature from the beginning until 1863 : online database – version 1.0 – Senckenberg Deutsches Entomologisches Institut.
Groll, E. K. 2017: Biographies of the Entomologists of the World. – Online database, version 8, Senckenberg Deutsches Entomologisches Institut, Müncheberg – URL: sdei.senckenberg.de/biografies

Publications 
 .
 .
 .

French entomologists
19th-century French physicians
Scientists from Dijon
1771 births
1860 deaths
École Normale Supérieure alumni